Perkhushkovo is a rural locality (a village) in Gorodishchenskoye Rural Settlement, Nyuksensky District, Vologda Oblast, Russia. The population was 5 as of 2002.

Geography 
Perkhushkovo is located 34 km southeast of Nyuksenitsa (the district's administrative centre) by road. Sloboda is the nearest rural locality.

References 

Rural localities in Nyuksensky District